Calanus is a genus of marine copepod in the family Calanidae (Order Calanoida).  The genus was split in 1974, with some species being placed in a new genus, Neocalanus. The following species are recognised:

Calanus aculeatus Brady, 1918
Calanus agulhensis De Decker, Kaczmaruk & Marska, 1991
Calanus chilensis Brodsky, 1959
Calanus dorsalis (Rafinesque, 1817)
Calanus euxinus Hulsemann, 1991
Calanus finmarchicus (Gunnerus, 1770)
Calanus glacialis Jaschnov, 1955
Calanus helgolandicus (Claus, 1863)
Calanus hyperboreus Krøyer, 1838
Calanus jashnovi Hulsemann, 1994
Calanus marshallae Frost, 1974
Calanus pacificus Brodsky, 1948
Calanus propinquus Brady, 1883
Calanus simillimus Giesbrecht, 1902
Calanus sinicus Brodsky, 1962
Calanus torticornis (Brady, 1918)

References 

Calanoida
Articles containing video clips
Copepod genera